U-Bahn Line D is a partially completed north‒south route of the Frankfurt U-Bahn underground rail network, planned since the 1960s.   three sections had been constructed and were in use for U-Bahn services, plus a long section operated with trams.  As the route is not continuous there are no through services, but instead underground services U1, U4, U8, U9 and tram lines 12, 15, 21 all partially serve some of the stops on the route then transfer to other routes.  The planned Ginnheim Curve extension would run via the University's  to fill the missing gap.

The most northerly section serving two stations on the new Reidberg settlement opened in 2010 and operates with U8 and U9 underground services.

The middle section between the main railway station at Frankfurt (Main) Hauptbahnhof and  opened in 2001 as an extension of U-Bahn Line B (U4 service).

South of the River Main between the University Hospital and Schwanheim the planned route remains operated by low-floor tram services but is mostly upgraded to light rail design running in its own reservation.

Sections
The route was originally planned in four parts. The numbering sequence may have reflected the sequence in which the sections were originally planned to be built.

D 0: Ginnheim – Heddernheim
In use, used by services U1 and U9.
The extension to Ginnheim originated in the 1970s. The line is rotated more than 90 degrees from the Line A, which is only explained by the intention to integrate the section later in the Line D.

D I: Hauptbahnhof – Bockenheimer Warte
In use, served by U4 services.
The line is operated line by U4 services as an extension of the U-Bahn Line B route.

D II: Bockenheimer Warte – Ginnheim
Planned.   construction of the Ginnheim Curve route was planned to occur in the 2020s on a route via the University's new Campus Westend.

Several routes to fill in the missing gap have been proposed.

A previous plan to link the two existing sections had been planned to start in 2006 using a route completely in tunnel.  One station would have been constructed at Franz-Rücker-Allee and the existing Ginnheim U-Bahn station relocated to below the Ginnheimer Landstraße.  Just before construction would have started, the measure was halted owing to changes in political majorities resulting from formation of a new coalition after the local elections of 2005.

D III: Hauptbahnhof – Niederrad

Incomplete and likely to remain operating as a tram line.  It was originally planned to run southwards from Frankfurt Hauptbahnhof, under the River Main to Niederrad and then on to Schwanheim or Frankfurt Stadion station.

 the only visible construction is an extra unused platform and a pair of stub tunnels heading southwards at the main railway station U-Bahn level.  The extra platform is only connected to track in the direction of Bockenheimer Warte and cannot be used in normal service.  This platform and the longer of the stub tunnels are used as the Firefighting Practice Tunnel by the Frankfurt Fire Brigade.
Sections of the planned route via  and  had been partially upgraded in the 1970s in anticipation of conversion to light rail operation.  Instead this route and its branches remain operated by tram services.

D IV: Riedberg extension
This section connects the stations Niederursel (on the Oberurseler branch of the A-line) and Kalbach (on the Bad Homburger branch of the A-line) with each other, thereby opening up the new housing area Riedberg. Two new stations were created in this section: University Campus Riedberg and Riedberg, the latter near the Nelly Sachs Platz. Larger work was an incision in the slope through which leads directly north of the station Niederursel the route to a new bridge to be built on the Rosa-Luxemburg-Straße and the bridge over the A 661 motorway immediately north of the junction Heddernheim.

In this connection, a connection between the stations Heddernheimer Landstraße and Wiesenau was established as a connection to the rest of the D line. For this, the existing route from the north portal of the northwest tunnel to the branch towards Heddernheim was swung slightly to the east, whereby the station Heddernheimer highway was shifted slightly to the east and was rebuilt with 80 cm high platforms. Since October 25, 2010 took place on the new track test drives.

Two lines went on 12 December 2010 in operation:

The line U8 leaves from the South Station, connected via the A-trunk line, to the Riedberg and ends there. It absorbs most of the traffic as long as section D II does not exist.
In addition, there is for the first time a line with the U9, which runs mainly on the D route. The U9 runs from Ginnheim to the northern end of the Line D on the Riedberg and on the Line A to Nieder-Eschbach.

Other Details
The starting point of the D route is the underground station Hauptbahnhof. This was already opened in 1978 as a preliminary end point of the B-line and has four arranged on the same level tracks, which are accessed via two island platforms. The station extends in a north-south direction under the station forecourt and is crossed by the underlying tracks of the City Tunnel approximately at right angles. The trains of lines U4 and U5 currently use only the two middle and the west track, while the eastern track is only one-sided connected to the existing routes and therefore can not be used in scheduled operation.

The Line D connects to the station in a northerly direction and follows Düsseldorfer Straße to Platz der Republik, while the tracks of the Line B branch off to the west. The existing tunnel stump is currently being used as a turning facility for the U5 line, and is due to be extended to Europaviertel by 2019.

The D-Tunnel continues to follow the Friedrich-Ebert-Anlage, where after a short time the underground station Festhalle / Messe is reached. The station was equipped with an extremely wide platform, taking into account the expected number of passengers at fairs. The platform hall itself has double storey height and is lit by two glass cones at street level with daylight.

Planned route to Rebstock: Behind the station are two short tunnel stumps, which were originally intended as an advance payment for a subway line into the Rebstock area. However, this connection was made in 2003 for reasons of cost by a tram line. Immediately afterwards, the two single-track line tunnels turn northwest and follow the Senckenberganlage up to the terminus Bockenheimer Warte. Immediately in front of the station branches off from the city-leading track in an easterly direction from a single-track line tunnel, which establishes a track connection to the overlying C-section. It is used only as an operating route and is only suitable for this, as it does not lead to the actual track rails, but on a siding. South of the station, the Senckenberg Museum of Natural History used the tunneling work to construct an underground two-storey warehouse complex that extends across the entire width of the Senckenberganlage and also has an emergency exit in the subway tunnel.

Bockenheimer Warte: The station Bockenheimer Warte itself was built in two sections. The northern part with the lying on level C tracks of the C route was completed in 1986. At that time, the intersecting elements of the D line and a direct connection between the two platforms were already being built. In contrast, the entire southern part of the station building with the lower tracks of the D line was only built in 2001. As at the train station Festhalle / Messe, the station of the D route received a very high platform hall. Here, however, were not design plans the cause, but the intention of the University to set up over the actual station another camp of the University Library. With the decision to abandon the campus Bockenheim in the medium term, the plans became obsolete and the existing spatial situation arose.

The planned route to Ginnheim Nord of the station is a four-track turning facility, which reaches just past Sophienstraße. If necessary, continuation (D II) would follow on the outer tracks. This is the reason for the abundant equipment with tracks, because it should then continue to be turned around.

Planning Stages

Bockenheimer Warte - Ginnheim (Line D I)
The second planned construction phase of Line D, is to connect at the station Bockenheimer waiting to the 2001 opened route. For an underground course along the tram line 16 was initially provided. Behind the Bockenheimer Warte, the planned tunnel should first follow the course of the Zeppelinallee, first under some apartment blocks north of the Sophienstraße and merge at the height of the Georg-Speyer-Straße into the Franz-Rücker-Allee. Here, the route would have reached the existing route of the tram line 16, the course of which they would have largely followed on the remaining stretch to Ginnheim. At the level of the Frauenfriedenskirche, the first intermediate station named Franz-Rücker-Allee was to be built. An originally planned at this point tunnel ramp was later rejected after local protests. Instead, the tunnel would have followed Franz-Rücker-Allee north. The Federal Highway 66 and the Bockenheimer cemetery would have been crossed west of the Ginnheimer highway, only at the height of the existing tram stop Markus Hospital would have the tunnel again reached the tram line. In the immediate aftermath, the second stop, located under the Ginnheimer Landstrasse, would have been reached. This was to bear the name Ginnheim and replace both the existing terminus of the U1 line and the tram stop at Markuskrankenhaus. In the area of today's light rail terminus, a new tunnel ramp was to be created, which would have established the connection between the D line and the U1 branch line operated since 1978. The start of construction of the 2004 adopted planning was scheduled for 2006, commissioning for 2010. The realization should cost a total of 173 million euros.

After the local elections in 2006, however, the already approved planning was discarded before the groundbreaking ceremony took place. On 16 December 2010, the city council decided to investigate possible route variants for the gap between the stations Ginnheim and Bockenheimer Warte. The concept "Ginnheimer Kurve" proposed by the citizens' initiative "Save the U5!" In 2010 should be taken into account. According to the report submitted in July 2015, two variants are to be pursued in a planning manner. At the end of 2015, the Frankfurt City Parliament decided to complete the closing of the gap, but did not commit to one of the two variants. However, the construction of the project should take place only in a few years.

Ginnheimer Kurve Variant
The route is to be led from the south in a long S-curve under the Miquelallee and the Grüneburgpark to Campus Westend. After the underground crossing of the junction Miquelallee the Federal Highway 66 is an aboveground section to the breakpoint at the Bundesbank run in high altitude next to the Money Museum. Here is a link with the planned tram ring line on the Wilhelm-Epstein-road possible. From the Bundesbank, the route runs above ground to the Platenstraße station and then follows it to the Ginnheim station, which is relocated to the south side of the Ginnheimer Landstraße under Rosa-Luxemburg-Straße.

For this variant, daily 12,250 additional passengers are expected, the construction costs should amount to a maximum of 193 million euros.

Europaturm Variant
The route runs from the Bockenheimer Warte under Miquelalle to the station Botanischer Garten south of the Miquelknotens. Thereafter, the route runs above ground in the middle of the Rosa-Luxemburg-Straße to the station Europaturm. North of Wilhelm-Epstein-Straße, the Rosa-Luxemburg-Straße has to be demolished and re-routed. It should run in this area at ground level and would have only two lanes, between which the Stadtbahntrasse via the new station Platenstraße to the station Ginnheim, where it connects to the existing route. For the variant Europe Tower is calculated with 12,470 additional passengers daily and construction costs of up to 174 million euros.

Both variants allow for the relocation of about 15,000 passengers daily from the Line A and 4,600 from the S-Bahn south of the station Ginnheim on the new subway line. In addition, in the variant "Ginnheimer curve" about 3000 and in the variant "Europaturm" about 5000 passengers from the tram line 16 to the subway change.

Southern Extension

Hauptbahnhof - Niederrad (D II)
The stretch to Niederrad, connects to the already built in 1978 tunnel stubs station Central Station, which currently extend approximately to the southern edge of the station forecourt. From here, the projected tunnel follows in a straight line the Wiesenhüttenstraße to the Main. Under the river, a curve connects to the west, about at the southern end of the Peace Bridge he reaches the other bank of the Main. Below the Theodor Stern quay, the first and only Südmainische tunnel station of the D route is to be created. From here, the route follows the Main river in a straight line and reaches the existing tram line via a ramp in the area of the university hospital. Until today's Heinrich-Hoffmann-Straße / Blutspendedienst station, the tram line, inaugurated in 1959, is already transposed independent of the road. On the other hand, more extensive expansion measures are required in the further course of the Deutschordenstraße, where the tram to this day shares the infrastructure with the rest of the road. The running through the Bruchfeldstraße tram route to Haardtwaldplatz should be set due to the low frequency and replaced by a bus line.

In the Triftstraße area, the line splits into two branches, which largely correspond to the existing tram routes to the stadium and to Schwanheim.

Niederrad - Schwanheim
The second part from Niederrad to Schwanheim was dismantled in 1975. The track has since been used for tram traffic and has its own track body in the middle of the road on the entire length. In the case of the switch to light rail operation, only the platforms of the existing stops would have to be expanded to a height of 80 cm and a length of 105 meters. The route runs along the Trift road and Adolf Miersch road to Niederrad station, where there is a connection to the S-Bahn network. In the further course follows the Stadtbahntrasse the Lyoner Straße through the office city Niederrad. At the Kiesschneise stop, the route of the former Frankfurt Waldbahn, which was opened in 1889, is reached. This was also prepared in the mid-70s for a possible light rail operation.

Shortly thereafter, today's tram line is abandoned again, the tram line swings along Strassburger Strasse to the north and crosses the settlement Goldstein. The required route was already prepared in the mid-70s and should have been created together with the new line by Niederrad. Due to protests of the residents, who feared a separation effect of the Stadtbahntrasse, the building was postponed to the time of conversion to Stadtbahn. In the meantime, however, it is planned to implement the new line in the medium term even without the use of a light rail system in order to improve the development of the residential area Goldstein.

At the Ferdinand-Dirichs-Weg the existing forest railway route is reached again. It leads along the edge of the forest to the terminus Rheinlandstraße, where the Frankfurt Traffic Museum is located. A continuation to the southern main entrance of the Industriepark Höchst was discussed, a precise planning does not exist so far.

Niederrad - Stadion
The branch to Stadion follows from the junction on the Triftstraße in a southerly direction of the Rennbahnstraße and Schwarzwaldstraße. Today's tram line runs in the middle of the lanes, only the tracks in northern direction are partially separated by road markings from the rest of the road. In the case of the switch to light rail operation would be here extensive reconstruction measures required to achieve a road-independent routing.

From the Oberforsthaus stop, the line leaves the street plan and turns onto a railway track that runs parallel to the Mörfelder Landstraße and widens after a few meters to the current stadium station. The Stadtbahnplanungen intend to give up the previous station and set up a new terminal further south, which should be located closer to the Waldstadion. A continuation to the airport would be possible from here.

Lines

U9

The U9 is a Frankfurt U-Bahn line that circulates from Ginnheim via Nordwestzentrum and Riedberg, to Nieder-Eschbach, Germany. It was opened with the U8 on 12 December 2010.

Opening Dates

References

Frankfurt U-Bahn
Railway lines opened in 2010